Hidden Col is a col in the northern part of the Medina Peaks in Antarctica, about  southwest of Marks Point, that allows a quick sledging route between the lower Amundsen Glacier and Scott Glacier. It was mapped by the United States Geological Survey from surveys and U.S. Navy air photos, 1960–64. The col was explored by the New Zealand Geological Survey Antarctic Expedition, 1969–70, and so named because it is hidden behind the ridges and spurs of the peaks to the northeast and southwest of it.

References

Mountain passes of the Ross Dependency
Amundsen Coast